Events from the year 1677 in art.

Events
Mosaics are created in St Mark's Basilica, Venice, from cartoons by Giovanni Antonio Fumiani.

Paintings

 Claude Lorrain paints The Voyage of Jacob in his late Roman period.
 Thomas Flatman paints miniature portraits.
 Pietro Giarguzzi - The Holy Trinity crowning the Blessed Virgin Mary (fresco) at San Carlo alle Quattro Fontane.
 Abraham Hondius - The Frozen Thames, a view over the Thames to the old London Bridge during the Little Ice Age.
 Pieter de Hooch - A Musical Party in a Courtyard.
 Charles Le Brun - Apotheose of Louis XIV.

Births
October 23 – Giuseppe Antonio Petrini, painter (died 1755/1759)
November 29 – Guillaume Coustou the Elder, French sculptor and academician (died 1746)
date unknown
Pompeo Aldrovandini, Italian painter (died 1735)
Lovia Casalina, Italian woman portrait-painter (died 1702)
Louis Du Guernier, French engraver (died 1716)
Abraham Rademaker, Dutch painter and printmaker (died 1735) 
Jean Raoux, French painter (died 1734)
probable
Antonio Dardani, Italian painter (died 1735)
Gasparo Lopez, Italian painter of flowers (died 1732)

Deaths
March 16 – Evaristo Baschenis, Italian Baroque painter primarily of still lifes (born 1617)
March 25 – Wenceslaus Hollar (Václav Hollar), Bohemian-born etcher working in England (born 1607)
April 20 – Mathieu Le Nain, French painter (born 1607)
August 28 – Wallerant Vaillant, Flemish painter and mezzotint engraver (born 1623), painted A Young Boy Copying a Painting and engraved Woman Peeling Fruit and A Boy Drawing a Bust of the Emperor Vitellius
November 9 – Aert van der Neer, Dutch painter (born 1603)
November 18 - Claude Audran the Elder, French engraver (born 1597)
date unknown
Giacomo Alboresi, Italian painter (born 1632)
Giovanni Battista Galestruzzi, Italian painter and etcher (born 1618)
Jan Peeters I, Flemish seascape painter (born 1624)
Cristoforo Savolini, Italian painter of altarpieces (born 1639)
Wang Jian, Chinese landscape painter during the Qing Dynasty (born 1598)

References

 
Years of the 17th century in art
1670s in art